"Sunrise" is a song by the Danish dance-pop duo Infernal. It was released as the second single from their second studio album, Waiting for Daylight, in 2000. The song samples the 1994 song "Silverflame" from the Danish alternative rock band Dizzy Mizz Lizzy.

Track listings

Credits and personnel
Written by Tim Christensen, Infernal, De La Ray, Adam Powers
Vocals by Lina Rafn, Moses Malone and Susanne Carstensen
All instruments by Infernal, except guitar by Steen Grøntved, darbuka by Lars Bo Kujahn
Additional keyboards by Michael Pfundheller
Produced by Infernal
Co-produced by DJ Aligator
Arranged by Infernal, except track 2 arranged by Infernal and DJ Aligator
Mixed by Infernal and Mark Hannibal @ Funk Yard Sound Studio
Mastered by Jan Eliasson @ Tocano
Executive producer: Kenneth Bager

Charts

References

2000 singles
Songs written by Adam Powers
Infernal (Danish band) songs
Songs written by Lina Rafn
Songs written by Paw Lagermann
2000 songs